Bermudo Ovéquiz (fl. 1044–1092) (also known as Vermudo) was a member of the highest ranks of the nobility of Asturias, León, and Galicia who lived in the 11th century.

Biographical sketch 
Bermudo Ovéquiz was the first-born son of  Oveco Bermúdez and his wife Elvira Suárez. His paternal grandparents were Bermudo Vela—a descendant of Count Bermudo Núñez— and Elvira Pinióliz.  His mother was granddaughter of rebel Rodrigo Romániz, nephew of Count Suero Gundemáriz, and she also descended from Osorio Gutiérrez, known as the "holy count".  Bermudo lived in Asturias where he probably inherited properties from his grandmother Elvira Pinióliz. He is first recorded in medieval charters in 1045 and appears in 1053 confirming a donation by King Ferdinand I of León to the Monastery of San Pelayo in Oviedo. In 1075, he and his brother Vela Ovéquiz were engaged in a legal dispute with the bishop of Oviedo on account of the Monastery of Tol. This monastery had been donated previously to the Cathedral of Oviedo by Gontrodo Gundemáriz, daughter of Count Gundemaro Pinióliz. Other relatives were also involved in this dispute, including Count Fernando Díaz and his sister Jimena, the wife of  Rodrigo Díaz de Vivar, El Cid. One of his sisters, Onecca, was the wife of Count Sancho Ordóñez. Even though he did not hold the title of count, he acted as the judge in a legal proceeding in 1087 involving the abbot of the Monastery of Lorenzana and the bishop of Mondoñedo.

Marriage and issue 
Married to Jimena Peláez, daughter of Count Pelayo Froilaz "the Deacon" and countess Aldonza Ordóñez, daughter of the Infantes Ordoño Ramírez and Cristina Bermúdez, the offspring of this marriage were:
 Suero (fl. 1086–12 August 1138), count and one of the most powerful and relevant figures in Asturias, a loyal vassal first of Raymond of Burgundy and then of the monarchs Alfonso VI, Urraca, and Alfonso VII of León.  
 Alfonso Bermúdez (fl. 1092-1129), unlike his male siblings, Alfonso did not hold the title of count nor did he serve in any relevant post.  His wife was Urraca Raimúndez who could have been the daughter of Infante Raymond Garcés "the Fratricide", who participated in the murder of his brother King Sancho IV of Pamplona, el de Peñalén. He and his legitimate wife were the parents of Pedro Alfonso, an Asturian magnate who dominated the region from 1139 until his death, Gonzalo, Gutierre, María, Ildonza, and Teresa Alfonso. 
 Gutierre Bermúdez (fl. 1086–1130), a count, husband of Toda Pérez de Traba and the father of Count Vela Gutiérrez. 
 Urraca Bermúdez (died 1132/1133), who married Count Gonzalo Ansúrez, brother of Count Pedro Ansúrez and parents of several children, including Sancha González, the wife of Fernando Pérez de Traba. In 1128, King Alfonso VII gave her some properties in San Vicente in Asturias de Santillana. 
 Jimena Bermúdez, the wife of Pelayo Muñoz who had a daughter, Velasquita Peláez, married to Munio Doniz.

They could have also been the parents of Sebastián Bermúdez who does not appear in any transactions executed by his siblings but whose filiation is confirmed in Galician charters.

Notes

References

Bibliography 

 
 

 
 

1092 deaths
11th-century births
11th-century people from the Kingdom of León